USS LST-1108 was an LST-542-class tank landing ship in the United States Navy. Like many of her class, she was not named and is properly referred to by her hull designation.

Operational history 
LST-1108 was laid down on 16 December 1944 at Evansville, Indiana, by the Missouri Valley Bridge & Iron Co.; launched on 1 February 1945; sponsored by Mrs. Edward H. Barnard; and commissioned on 27 February 1945.

Following World War II, LST-1108 performed occupation duty in the Far East until early December 1945. She was decommissioned on 15 August 1946 and struck from the Navy list on 25 September that same year. On 10 January 1948, the ship was sold for service in Argentina and renamed Doña Irma.

Argentine service 
In Argentine Navy service, Doña Irma was renamed ARA Cabo San Sebastian (BDT-11) (Buque Desembarco de Tanques). She was retired in 1966.

References

Notes

Bibliography

External links 
  history.navy.mil: USS LST-1108
  navsource.org: USS LST-1108

 

LST-542-class tank landing ships
World War II amphibious warfare vessels of the United States
Ships built in Evansville, Indiana
1945 ships
LST-542-class tank landing ships of the Argentine Navy